Tropical Depression Two-E was a short-lived tropical cyclone that brought heavy rainfall to southwestern Mexico. It was the only cyclone during the month in the eastern North Pacific Ocean, forming on June 3 from a tropical wave. The depression initially moved northeastward, threatening the Mexican states of Michoacán and Guerrero with a potential of it attaining tropical storm status. It remained a tropical depression, weakening due to land interaction and wind shear, and on June 5 it dissipated just off the coast. Rainfall from the depression peaked at 19.1 inches (486 mm) in Acapulco, which resulted in mudslides and flooding. A total of 42 houses were flooded, and 72 people were forced to leave their homes due to the storm; no deaths were reported.

Meteorological history

The tropical depression originated from a tropical wave off the southern coast of Mexico in late May 2006. An area of convection was associated with the wave, and forecasters at the National Hurricane Center (NHC) remarked that environmental conditions favored gradual development. The system, which was enhanced by the Intertropical Convergence Zone (ITCZ), drifted northward with an anticyclone to its east and west. On June 1, the convection became more concentrated, and by early the next day it developed a low pressure area; by that time, it began a steady northwestward track.

An upper-level anticyclone north of the system provided a more favorable environment for organization, allowing the convection to organize into banding features. The system also developed good outflow, though initially the surface circulation was too elongated for it to be considered a tropical cyclone. Early on June 3, the nearby anticyclone moved northeastward, which increased wind shear over the system and caused it briefly to become less-organized. However, convection increased over the center, and at 1500 UTC on June 3 the NHC classified the system as Tropical Depression Two-E about 140 mi (240 km) southwest of Zihuatanejo, Guerrero; the upgrade was due to the system developing sufficiently organized convection, as well as a closed surface circulation.

Upon being classified as a tropical cyclone, the depression was in an area not favorable for significant strengthening, due to land interaction and wind shear. It was tracking steadily northeastward, and as it moved closer to the coastline, the center of the depression was difficult to locate. However, the overall organization briefly improved, and in one forecast the depression was predicted to attain tropical storm status. Early on June 4, convection weakened significantly, leaving the center partially exposed. Continued wind shear brought most of the associated thunderstorm activity onshore southwestern Mexico while the center of the depression remained just offshore. Late on June 4, the circulation accelerated away from the deep convection as it passed a short distance south of Acapulco. Early on June 5, the circulation dissipated, and later that night the remnants moved inland.

Preparations and impact

Due to uncertainty in whether the depression would attain tropical storm status or not, the government of Mexico issued a tropical storm warning from Punta San Telmo, Michoacán to Acapulco, Guerrero. Prior to affecting the coastline, the Mexican meteorological agency issued a heavy rainfall advisory, also mentioning the potential for flooding and mudslides, for the states of Jalisco, Colima, Michoacán, Guerrero, and Oaxaca. Officials prepared 21 shelters in the region.

The depression produced heavy rainfall along the coastline, including a total of 19.1 inches (486 mm) measured in a 48‑hour period in Acapulco. Totals of over 2 inches (50 mm) spread across much of Guerrero and Oaxaca, causing flash flooding and mudslides. The storm partially flooded about 40 houses, and a total of 72 people were forced to leave their homes. In Acapulco, floodwaters washed trash from street corners onto the beaches. Elsewhere in Guerrero, the flooding and mudslides blocked several highways, which stranded dozens of vehicles. The wall of a prison collapsed due to the rainfall. Also in Acapulco, the rainfall downed trees and power lines, causing power outages and sparking a fire when a transformer exploded. No deaths were reported.

References

External links

Advisory Archive

02E
02E
2006 Pacific hurricane season
2-E